Nettlefold is an English surname. Notable people with the surname include:

Archibald Nettlefold (1870-1944), once owner of Walton film studios in England
Bill Nettlefold  (born 1953), Australian rules footballer
Frederick Nettlefold (1833–1913), British industrialist
John Sutton Nettlefold (1792–1866), British industrialist and entrepreneur
John Sutton Nettlefold JP (1866–1930), English politician
Joseph Henry Nettlefold (1827–1881), British industrialist
Michael Nettlefold (born 1959), Australian rules footballer

English-language surnames